Lecithocera squamifera is a moth in the family Lecithoceridae. It was described by Edward Meyrick in 1929. It is found on New Hanover Island in Papua New Guinea.

The wingspan is about 14 mm. The forewings are fuscous, sprinkled darker. The discal stigmata are cloudy and dark fuscous, the second forming the upper end of a slender transverse mark on the end of the cell. The hindwings are grey, with the veins darker.

References

Moths described in 1929
squamifera